Karnali Zone was one of the fourteen zones of Nepal, comprising five districts, namely, Dolpa, Humla, Jumla, Kalikot and Mugu. Here is district wise List of Monuments which is in the Karnali Zone.

Karnali Zone
 List of monuments in Dolpa District
 List of monuments in Humla District
 List of monuments in Jumla District
 List of monuments in Kalikot District
 List of monuments in Mugu District

References

Karnali Zone
Karnali Zone